WOTL or Wotl may refer to:

 Final Fantasy Tactics: War of the Lions, a tactical role-playing game developed and published by Square Enix for the PlayStation Portable
 Wide outside through lane, highway lane configuration used on United States roads; see wide outside lane
 WOTL, a radio station (90.3 FM) licensed to Toledo, Ohio, United States